Paternus (Welsh Padarn) may refer to:
Aspasius Paternus, (fl. 3rd century), Roman official
Ovinius Paternus, consul 267
Paternus (consul 269), Roman consul
Padarn Beisrudd (born 400), Welsh for Paternus Redcoat, Romano-British commander in Scotland
Padarn (died 550), Welsh bishop

The Paterni were a prominent family in third century Rome.